Treille or La Treille, French for a grapevine or trellis, may refer to:

 La Treille, a Marseille neighborhood
 La Treille, Saint Lucia, a town on the island of Saint Lucia in the Caribbean
 Saint-Hilaire-la-Treille, a village in Haute-Vienne department in central-Western France
 Lille Cathedral, also known as Notre Dame de la Treille, French monument in Lille
 Treille (river), in French department of Loiret, second tributary of Loing river

Treilles may refer to :
 Treilles, a commune in Aude département of southwestern France
 Treilles-en-Gâtinais, a town in the Loiret département or north-central France

See also
Latreille (surname)